Rous was an electoral district of the Legislative Assembly in the Australian state of New South Wales, created in the 1904 re-distribution of electorates following the 1903 New South Wales referendum, which required the number of members of the Legislative Assembly to be reduced from 125 to 90. It consisted of parts of Lismore and The Tweed. It was named after Rous County, between the Tweed and Richmond Rivers and Henry John Rous, who explored the rivers. In 1913, it was replaced by Byron.

Members for Rous

Election results

References

Former electoral districts of New South Wales
Constituencies established in 1904
1904 establishments in Australia
Constituencies disestablished in 1913
1913 disestablishments in Australia